Club Deportivo Ciempozuelos is a Spanish football team based in Ciempozuelos, in the autonomous community of Madrid. Founded in 1968 it plays in Preferente, holding home matches at Polideportivo Peñuelas, with a capacity of 1,000 seats.

Season to season

16 seasons in Tercera División

Famous players
 Abel Resino
 Juan Antonio Señor

External links
Official website 
Madrid Football Federation 
Futbolme team profile 

Football clubs in the Community of Madrid
Association football clubs established in 1968
Divisiones Regionales de Fútbol clubs
1968 establishments in Spain